Woyrsch is a German surname.  It is the name of an old Bohemian noble family, branches of which still exist today.  Notable people with the surname include:

Felix Woyrsch (1860–1944), German composer and choir director
Remus von Woyrsch (1847–1920), Prussian field marshal and member of the Prussian House of Lords, uncle of Udo von Woyrsch
Udo von Woyrsch (1895–1983), German SS officer and Holocaust perpetrator, nephew of Remus von Woyrsch

German-language surnames